"1000 Miles" is a song written by David Stenmarck and Nick Jarl and performed by Swedish rock band H.E.A.T. at Melodifestivalen 2009. Participating in the third semifinal inside the Skellefteå Kraft Arena on 14 February 2009, the song reached the final, ending up ninth.

The single peaked at third position at the Swedish singles chart. In April 2009, the song entered Svensktoppen

Contributors (H.E.A.T)
Kenny Leckremo - vocals
Dave Dalone - electric guitar
Eric Rivers - electric guitar
Jimmy Jay - electric bass
Jona Tee - keyboard, backing vocals
Crash - drums

Charts

Weekly charts

Year-end charts

References

External links
Information at Svensk mediedatabas

2009 singles
English-language Swedish songs
Melodifestivalen songs of 2009
2009 songs
Songs written by Nick Jarl